Hombres was a Norwegian-Swedish drama series that aired on TVNorge during the winter of 2007 and on Kanal 5 the autumn of 2006.

Plot 
The criminal Pål Skogland has been sitting in prison, where he got information on 354 million he could get his hands on. Skogland puts together a team. He gets Manne af Ejderhorn, an upper class kid,  and the two brothers Victor and Emil Carlberg. The two works in a financial company they are going to steal the money from. The 354 million is going to be transferred to a bank in Majorca, Spain. Everything seems to be going their way until they arrive in Majorca.

Ratings 
The series premiere had 177 000 viewers. In Sweden the premiere was watched by 160 000 viewers.

References

External links 
 Hombres med ambisoner 
 Skolmen og hans menn 
 
 

Swedish drama television series
Norwegian drama television series
Spain in fiction
2006 Norwegian television series debuts
2006 Norwegian television series endings
TVNorge original programming
2006 Swedish television series debuts
2006 Swedish television series endings
2000s Swedish television series
2000s Norwegian television series